Marcos Alejandro Riccardi (born March 2, 1982) is a field hockey midfielder from Argentina. He was a member of the national squad at the 2006 Men's Hockey World Cup in Mönchengladbach where they finished 10th place overall. He was also a member of the Argentinian Olympic team that finished in 8th place at the 2000 Summer Olympics in Sydney, Australia.

References
 Argentine Hockey Federation

External links

1982 births
Living people
Argentine male field hockey players
Field hockey players at the 2000 Summer Olympics
Olympic field hockey players of Argentina
Place of birth missing (living people)
Pan American Games gold medalists for Argentina
Pan American Games medalists in field hockey
Field hockey players at the 2003 Pan American Games
Medalists at the 2003 Pan American Games
2002 Men's Hockey World Cup players
2006 Men's Hockey World Cup players
21st-century Argentine people